Aaron Daniel Clapham (born 15 January 1987) is a former New Zealand footballer and current Football coach. Clapham spent most of his senior footballing career with ISPS Handa Premiership club Canterbury United FC.

Club career
In 2005 Clapham accepted a football scholarship at Saint Francis University, Loretto, Pennsylvania before joining the University of Louisville where he spent 2 seasons, scoring 8 times in 37 appearances. He then moved to Australia, joining Dandenong Thunder in the Victorian Premier League.

Clapham played 117 times for Canterbury United, having scored 61 goals from the centre of midfield. His first goal came in his club's 2–0 victory over Waikato FC on 8 November 2009. Having helped his side to 4th in the New Zealand Football Championship and progressing to the playoff final, he was awarded New Zealand Football Championship Player of the Year for the 2009–10 season.

Clapham has long been considered one of the top players in the New Zealand Football Championship, being named to the league's team of the month in November, December, January, and February during the 2009–10 season. Clapham captained Canterbury United to their highest league position of 2nd place in the 2011–12 season.

On 7 February 2011, he signed a one-game loan deal from Canterbury United to play for Wellington Phoenix in the A-League.

On 2 June 2020, he retired from football, after a final season at Canterbury United Dragons.

International career
Clapham has earned national representation at Under-20 level, where he represented New Zealand at the 2007 FIFA U-20 World Cup in Canada.

After impressing for Canterbury United during the 2009–10 season, Clapham was selected as a part of a 15-man FIFA World Cup training camp for Australia and New Zealand-based players. Following a strong performance for New Zealand 'A' against a NZFC Select XI at the conclusion of the camp on 8 May 2010, Clapham was named as a surprise call-up by All Whites coach Ricki Herbert for New Zealand's 2010 FIFA World Cup campaign.

Clapham made his official international debut on 10 October 2010 when he came on as a late substitute in his country's 1–1 draw with Honduras.

International goals and caps
New Zealand's goal tally first.

International career statistics

Coaching career 
Clapham was named on 31 July 2020, as Assistant coach of the New Zealand national under-17 football team.

Personal life
His sister Sara Clapham also represented New Zealand internationally, making 3 appearances for the New Zealand senior women's team.

References

External links
 
 NZ Football Profile

1987 births
Living people
Saint Francis University alumni
University of Louisville alumni
Louisville Cardinals men's soccer players
Canterbury United players
Wellington Phoenix FC players
New Zealand association footballers
New Zealand international footballers
2010 FIFA World Cup players
2012 OFC Nations Cup players
Dandenong Thunder SC players
Association football midfielders
Team Wellington players
New Zealand Football Championship players